is a passenger railway station in the city of Chikusei, Ibaraki, Japan, operated by East Japan Railway Company (JR East).

Lines
Kawashima Station is served by the Mito Line, and is located 10.4 km from the official starting point of the line at Oyama Station.

Station layout
The station consists of two opposed side platforms connected to the station building by a footbridge. The station is staffed.

Platforms

History
It was renamed to its present name 25 May 1889. A new station building was completed in January 2015.

Passenger statistics
In fiscal 2019, the station was used by an average of 776 passengers daily (boarding passengers only).

Surrounding area
 
Kinugawa River

See also
 List of railway stations in Japan

References

External links

 JR East Station Information 

Railway stations in Ibaraki Prefecture
Mito Line
Railway stations in Japan opened in 1889
Chikusei